Great Kills is a neighborhood within the borough of Staten Island in New York City. It is located on the island's South Shore, and according to many local geographers, it is the South Shore's northernmost community. It is bordered by Richmondtown to the north, Bay Terrace to the east, Eltingville to the west, and Great Kills Harbor to the south.

Kill is an archaic Dutch word with various popular translations, including "creek" and "channel". Indeed, many small streams dot the neighborhood, and the name can be interpreted as meaning that a great number of such streams can be found there.

As of 2021, the neighborhood is represented in the New York State Senate by Great Kills resident Andrew Lanza, in the New York State Assembly by Michael Reilly and Michael Tannousis, and in the New York City Council by Joseph Borelli.  All four are members of the Republican Party.

Great Kills is part of Staten Island Community District 3, and its ZIP Codes are 10308 and a small part of 10306. The neighborhood is patrolled by the 122nd Precinct of the New York City Police Department.

History
The eastern half of what has been known since 1865 as Great Kills was originally named Clarendon after a British colonial governor, and the western half was named Newtown. For a time, both were known as Giffords, after Daniel Gifford, a local commissioner and surveyor. The name survives in Giffords Lane and Giffords Glen, which are adjacent to the Great Kills train station that was formerly named Giffords, and also in the Gifford School, P.S. 32. The term "Great Kills" traces back informally at least to 1664, the final year of the Dutch colony of New Amsterdam, when French settler Jacques Guyon called the area "La Grand Kills".

From the 1680s when English colonial government was organized, until 1898 when Staten Island consolidated into New York City, eastern Great Kills was officially part of the town of Southfield, Richmond County, New York, and western Great Kills was officially part of Westfield. Great Kills and Staten Island's other East Shore neighborhoods were mostly rural and dotted with shoreline resorts until the 1950s, after which the Verrazzano-Narrows Bridge brought heavy residential growth from Brooklyn.

The 17th-century Poillon-Seguine-Britton House near Great Kills Harbor was added to the National Register of Historic Places in 1984, but was burned in 1989 and demolished in 1996. The American Institute of Aeronautics and Astronautics selected what is now Great Kills Park as a "Historic Aerospace Site" in 2006, to commemorate a pioneering rocket launch in 1933.

Demographics
Based on data from the 2010 United States Census, the population of Great Kills was 40,720, a change of -960 (-2.4%) from the 41,680 counted in 2000. The racial makeup of the neighborhood was 87.5% (35,649) White, 0.4% (169) African American, 0.1% (26) Native American, 3.0% (1,233) Asian, 0.0% (8) Pacific Islander, 0.1% (56) from other races, and 0.8% (331) from two or more races. Hispanic or Latino of any race were 8.0% (3,248) of the population.

The entirety of Community District 3, which comprises Great Kills and other South Shore neighborhoods, had 159,132 inhabitants as of NYC Health's 2018 Community Health Profile, with an average life expectancy of 81.3 years at birth. This is about the same as the life expectancy of 81.2 for all New York City neighborhoods. Most inhabitants are youth and middle-aged adults: 21% are between the ages of 0 and 17, 26% between 25 and 44, and 29% between 45 and 64. The ratio of college-aged and elderly residents was lower, at 8% and 16% respectively.

As of 2017, the median household income in Community District 3 was $96,796. In 2018, an estimated 11% of South Shore residents lived in poverty, compared to 17% in all of Staten Island and 20% in all of New York City. On average during 2012–2016, one in sixteen South Shore residents (6%) were unemployed, compared to 6% in Staten Island and 9% in New York City. Rent burden, or the percentage of renters who paid more than 30% of their income for housing, was 42% for the South Shore, compared to the boroughwide and citywide rates of 49% and 51%, respectively. , Great Kills and the South Shore were considered middle- to high-income relative to the rest of the city, and not gentrifying.

Political representation
In the United States House of Representatives, Great Kills is located within New York's 11th congressional district, represented by Republican Nicole Malliotakis, a former resident of the neighborhood. Great Kills is part of the 24th State Senate district, represented by Republican Andrew Lanza, and the 62nd and 64th State Assembly districts, represented respectively by Republicans Michael Reilly and Michael Tannousis. In the New York City Council, Great Kills is part of District 51, represented by Republican Joseph Borelli.

Police and crime

Great Kills is patrolled by the 122nd Precinct of the NYPD, after shifting out of the 123rd when Staten Island's precinct maps were redrawn on July 1, 2013. The neighborhoods represented by these two precincts were the two safest (out of 69) in a 2010 study of New York's per-capita crime statistics. With a non-fatal assault rate of 25 per 100,000 people (2012–2014), the South Shore's rate of violent crimes per capita was less than half that of the city as a whole. The incarceration rate of 193 per 100,000 people (2015–2016) was also less than half that of the city as a whole. The rate of licensed gun ownership was among the city's highest in the 2010 study, as was the rate of opioid abuse.

Like most of New York City, the 122nd Precinct has a substantially lower crime rate than in the 1990s, with crimes across all categories having decreased by 88.3% between 1990 and 2022. The precinct reported one murder, eight rapes, 63 robberies, 128 felony assaults, 91 burglaries, 373 grand larcenies, and 136 grand larcenies auto in 2022.

Fire safety
Great Kills is served by the New York City Fire Department (FDNY) Engine Company 162, Ladder Company 82, and Battalion 23, located at 256 Nelson Avenue. Where FF Gary Abrams served the Great Kills community for countless decades. Also the home to Lt Michael Bernstein aka “the Dehydrator”

Health
Preterm and teenage births are less common in Great Kills and the South Shore than in other places citywide. For the South Shore in 2015, there were 77 preterm births per 1,000 live births (compared to 87 per 1,000 citywide), and 3.6 teenage births per 1,000 live births (compared to 19.3 per 1,000 citywide). The South Shore has a relatively low percentage of residents who are uninsured. The population of uninsured adults was estimated to be 4%, less than the citywide rate of 12%, though this was based on a small sample size in 2015–2016.

In 2015–2016, 17% of South Shore adults were smokers, which was higher than the city average of 14%. For the South Shore, 26% of adults were obese, 9% were diabetic, and 22% had high blood pressure—compared to the citywide averages of 24%, 11%, and 28%, respectively. In addition, 17% of children were obese, compared to the citywide average of 20%.

Ninety-five percent of South Shore adults ate some fruits and vegetables every day, which was more than the city's average of 87%. In 2015–2016, 88% of adults described their health as "good," "very good," or "excellent," more than the city's average of 78%. For every supermarket on the South Shore, there were 4 bodegas. During late 2020, Great Kills spent weeks with the highest coronavirus rate of any New York City ZIP Code, and in the center of a State-designated "Orange Zone" cluster of cases.

The nearest major hospital is Staten Island University Hospital South Campus in Prince's Bay.

Post office and ZIP Codes
Great Kills generally is coextensive with the ZIP Code 10308, which the United States Postal Service serves from its Great Kills Station at 1 Nelson Avenue. A small portion of ZIP Code 10306, between Amboy Road and Siedenburg Park, is sometimes considered part of the Great Kills neighborhood.

Education

Great Kills and the South Shore generally have a similar rate of college-educated residents to the rest of the city. While 41% of South Shore residents of age 25+ had a college education or higher in 2012–2016, 8% had less than a high school education and 51% were high school graduates or had some college education. Citywide, 43% of adults had a college education or higher. The percentage of South Shore students achieving at grade level in math rose from 48% in 2000 to 65% in 2011, though reading achievement declined from 55% to 52% during the same time period.

For the South Shore, 12% of elementary school students were absent for 19 or more days of the 2016–2017 school year, less than the citywide average of 20%. Additionally, 89% of high school students from the South Shore graduated on time, more than the citywide average of 75%.

Schools
Barnes I.S. 24 in Great Kills is one of Staten Island's public intermediate schools (grades 6–8), named for the local educator and civic activist Myra S. Barnes (1880–1962). Dubbed the "Fighting Lady", she was well known for highlighting Staten Island issues to the New York City government. Firefighter Scott Davidson, lost in the September 11 attacks of 2001, attended I.S. 24, and is one of 29 local victims memorialized by an eternal flame at St. Clare's, the neighborhood's prominent Catholic church and parochial school.

In 2009, The New York Times reported: "The three public schools in Great Kills, two of them elementary schools [P.S. 8 and P.S. 32], are among the best in the city." In 2008, Today's Catholic Teacher magazine selected St. Clare's School as one of twelve nationwide to receive the "Catholic Schools for Tomorrow Award".

Libraries
The New York Public Library (NYPL) operates two locations nearby. The Great Kills branch is located at 56 Giffords Lane. The branch was opened in 1927 as a one-story building and was replaced by the current three-story building in 1954. Fully renovated in 2005, it currently has a lower level for community events, a first floor for adults, and a second floor for children's collections.

The Richmondtown branch is located at 200 Clarke Avenue, just outside Great Kills. It opened in 1996 and contains two floors: a first floor for adults and a second floor for children.

Recreation

The neighborhood is home to the Great Kills Little League, one of eight Little Leagues on Staten Island, and winner of the state baseball championship in 2011. Another thousand neighborhood children participate in sports teams organized through St. Clare's Church and its spin-off Great Kills Soccer Club. St. Clare's cheerleading squad won a Northeast divisional championship in 2016.

Located right beside the Great Kills Little League is the Great Kills Swim Club. This is a private club that belongs to over 500 families and competes in swimming and diving with other swim clubs in the borough. The Great Kills Swim Club is the site of the 2015 movie Staten Island Summer written by comedian Colin Jost, who was a lifeguard there as a teenager. The neighborhood also plays a key role in the 2009 Dutch film Great Kills Road.

Great Kills was the site of the first middleweight boxing championship, when Nonpareil Jack Dempsey defeated George Fulljames in 1884 for the title.

At the southeastern corner of the neighborhood is Great Kills Park, part of the Gateway National Recreation Area. The park includes a beach, trails, fishing and bird-watching areas, sports fields, and the Nichols Marina, with several private marinas nearby. The shorefront has required extensive work after heavy damage from Hurricane Sandy in 2012.

Transportation
Great Kills is served by the Staten Island Railway and numerous local and express buses. The railway serves the neighborhood via the Great Kills station, located at Giffords Lane near Amboy Road. Express train service between Great Kills and the St. George Ferry Terminal is maintained during the morning and evening weekday rush hours, while local trains serve the station 24/7. Parallel to Amboy Road, the neighborhood's other major commercial streets are Arthur Kill Road and Hylan Boulevard.

Notable people

People who were born in, residents of, or otherwise closely associated with Great Kills include:

 Stephen Caracappa (1941–2017), detective convicted of eight murders
 Alfred C. Cerullo III (born 1961), politician and actor
 Roy Clark (1933–2018), country musician, co-host of Hee Haw
 Helen Clevenger (1917–1936), NYU student who was murdered in North Carolina
 Romi Cohn (1929–2020), rabbi, mohel and real estate developer 
 Pete Davidson (born 1993), comedian for Saturday Night Live
 Edmund J. Dobbin (1935–2015), priest, president of Villanova University
 Joey Faye (born Joseph Antony Palladino, c.1910–1997), comedian
 Vincent Fanelli (1883–1966), professional harpist
 Matthew Festa (born 1993), baseball pitcher
 Vito Fossella (born 1965), politician
 Zack Granite (born 1992), baseball outfielder
 James Guyon Jr. (1778–1846), politician
 Daniel Paul Higgins (1886–1953), architect
 Andrew Lanza (born 1964), politician
 Nicholas LaPorte (1926–1990), politician
 Nicole Malliotakis (born 1980), politician
 Thomas John McDonnell (1894–1961), priest, bishop
 Alyssa Milano (born 1972), actress
 Ralph Munroe (1851–1933), yacht designer and pioneering settler of Miami
 Kevin O'Connor (born c.1947), basketball executive
 Garry Pastore (born 1961), actor, brother of Eric Blackwood (musician)
 Angelina Pivarnick (born 1986), Jersey Shore cast member
 Louis N. Scarcella (born c.1951), homicide detective involved in 15 overturned convictions
 Francesco Scavullo (1921–2004), celebrity photographer
 Ricky Schroder (born 1970), actor
 Robert A. Straniere (born 1941), politician

References

External links

 "Vintage Photos of Great Kills", Staten Island Advance, June 24–29, 2016.
 Ted Doerzbacher, "A fond remembrance of Staten Island's Great Kills community from a life-long resident", Staten Island Advance, January 19, 2014.

 
Neighborhoods in Staten Island
Populated coastal places in New York (state)